Josiah Quincy may refer to:

Josiah Quincy I (1710–1784), American merchant, planter, soldier, and politician
Josiah Quincy II (1744–1775), American lawyer and patriot
Josiah Quincy III (1772–1864), American educator and political figure, mayor of Boston, 1823–1828
Josiah Quincy Jr. (1802–1882), American politician, mayor of Boston, 1845–1849
Josiah Quincy (1859–1919), American politician from Massachusetts, mayor of Boston, 1896–1900
Josiah Quincy (New Hampshire politician) (1793–1875), American politician and lawyer in New Hampshire

See also
Josiah Quincy House, home of Josiah Quincy I
Quincy Mansion, also known as the Josiah Quincy Mansion, a summer home built by Josiah Quincy Jr.
Quincy Market, market complex in Boston, named in honor of Josiah Quincy III
Quincy political family
Quincy House (Harvard College), one of twelve undergraduate residential Houses at Harvard University.